Hettange-Grande (Lorraine Franconian: Grouss-Hetténgen) is a commune in the Moselle department in Grand Est in north-eastern France.

The town gives its name to the Hettangian age, the earliest age of the Jurassic period of the geologic timescale.

Geography
Hettange-Grande is located close to the borders between Belgium, France, Germany, and Luxembourg.

Transportation
The commune is located on the A31 autoroute (also called the Lorraine-Bourgogne autoroute) which links the Burgundy region with Luxembourg. Departmental road 653, which runs from Thionville to Frisange (Luxembourg), crosses the town centre.

History
Hettange-Grande was part of the Duchy of Luxembourg until the 1659 Treaty of the Pyrenees, when it was ceded to France during the first Partition of Luxembourg, along with the nearby town of Thionville.

Population

Twin towns
Hettange-Grande is twinned with:
  Sinzig, Germany, since 1966,
  Pederobba, Italy, since 1977

See also
 Communes of the Moselle department

References

External links
 

Communes of Moselle (department)